Maria (Mary) Lalopoulou (1926 – 14 May 1989) was a Greek actress. She took part in characteristic roles in several films mainly comedy. She died on 14 May 1989.

Filmography

External links 

1926 births
1989 deaths
Greek actresses
20th-century Greek actresses
Actresses from Athens